is a Japanese international rugby union player who plays as a flanker.

Club career

Nunomaki has played all of his senior club rugby in Japan with the Panasonic Wild Knights who he joined in 2015.   He was a Top League winner in his debut season with the Wild Knights, making 8 appearances and scoring 1 try.

International

Nunomaki received his first call-up to Japan's senior squad ahead of the 2016 end-of-year rugby union internationals.

References

1992 births
Living people
Japanese rugby union players
Japan international rugby union players
Rugby union flankers
Waseda University alumni
Saitama Wild Knights players
Sportspeople from Fukuoka Prefecture
Waseda University Rugby Football Club players
Sunwolves players